Sandugach (Handuğas) is a rural locality (a village) in Shtandinsky Selsoviet, Baltachevsky District, Bashkortostan, Russia. The population was 1 as of 2010. There is 1 street.

Geography 
Sandugach is located 29 km east of Starobaltachevo (the district's administrative centre) by road. Kigazy is the nearest rural locality.

References 

Rural localities in Baltachevsky District